Pecado mortal  is a Mexican telenovela produced by Telesistema Mexicano in 1960. Were starring Amparo Rivelles, Elsa Cárdenas, Osvaldo Calvo, and Tito Junco as the antagonist. Written by Caridad Bravo Adams and produced by Raúl Astor.

Cast 
 Amparo Rivelles 
 Elsa Cárdenas 
 Osvaldo Calvo 
 Tito Junco 
 Freddy Fernández "El Pichi"
 Rosa Elena Durgel 
 Rebecca San Román

Adaptations

References

External links 
 Página de alma-latina.net

1960 telenovelas
Mexican telenovelas
Televisa telenovelas
Television shows set in Mexico
1960 Mexican television series debuts
1960 Mexican television series endings
Spanish-language telenovelas